Humberto Horacio Ballesteros (born 8 May 1944 in Pontevedra, Buenos Aires) is an Argentine goalkeeper.

References

1944 births
Living people
Sportspeople from Buenos Aires Province
Argentine footballers
Argentine expatriate footballers
Argentine Primera División players
Peruvian Primera División players
Categoría Primera A players
Club Atlético River Plate footballers
Club Atlético Lanús footballers
Millonarios F.C. players
Club Universitario de Deportes footballers
Atlético Chalaco footballers
Sport Boys footballers
Deportivo Municipal footballers
Expatriate footballers in Colombia
Expatriate footballers in Peru

Association football goalkeepers